Kagal is a town in Kolhapur district of the Indian state of Maharashtra.

Kagal may also refer to:

Kagal (Vidhan Sabha constituency)
Qahal
Kagal (Finnish resistance movement)

See also
Kahal  (disambiguation)